George B. Field (born October 25, 1929 in Providence, Rhode Island) is an American astrophysicist.

Early life, family and education 

Field was born  in Providence, Rhode Island. His father Winthrop Brooks Field and mother Pauline Woodworth Field were Harvard and Radcliffe graduates, respectively. He became interested in astronomy at an early age, but at the urging of his father he studied chemical engineering at the Massachusetts Institute of Technology. Disliking engineering, he later switched to astrophysics. After MIT, he attended the graduate school at Princeton University. When working at Princeton he had his first child, Christopher Field in 1957. Four years following he went on to have a daughter, Natasha Field, both with former wife Sylvia Field. He remarried in 1981, to his present wife Susan.

Career
Field worked on plasma oscillations and later became interested in cosmology. In 1973, he became the founding director of the Center for Astrophysics  Harvard & Smithsonian, an organizational structure that unified the Smithsonian Astrophysical Observatory (a government agency) and the Harvard College Observatory (a private institution) under a single management. Field served as Director until 1982, when he was succeeded by Irwin I. Shapiro.

In the early 1980s, Field chaired an influential National Academy of Sciences decadal study that recommended priorities for US astronomical research.

He has researched on magnetohydrodynamics and magnetic fields in astronomy.

Doctoral students 
Among his doctoral students were Eric G. Blackman, Sean M. Carroll, Carl E. Heiles, and Christopher McKee.

Awards 
1978 Karl Schwarzschild Medal
2014 Henry Norris Russell Lectureship

References

External links 
George B. Field at Harvard.edu
Oral history interview transcript with George B. Field on 14 July 1980, American Institute of Physics, Niels Bohr Library & Archives - Session I
Oral history interview transcript with George B. Field on 15 July 1980, American Institute of Physics, Niels Bohr Library & Archives - Session II
Oral history interview transcript with George B. Field on 5 December 2007, American Institute of Physics, Niels Bohr Library & Archives

1929 births
Living people
Massachusetts Institute of Technology School of Science alumni
People from Providence, Rhode Island
Harvard University staff
Members of the United States National Academy of Sciences
Fellows of the American Physical Society
Harvard–Smithsonian Center for Astrophysics people